Elections to Wolverhampton City Council were held on 6 May 2010 in Wolverhampton, England. One third of the council was up for election, with the Wednesfield North ward electing two Councillors due to the resignation of a Councillor in January 2010 - the winning candidate will serve a 4-year term of office and the second placed candidate will serve a 1-year term.

The 2010 election saw a full slate of 20 candidates from the Conservative, Labour and Liberal Democrat parties. UKIP and the British National Party each fielded 4 candidates and 5 independents also stood.  The Green Party had no candidates for the first time in a number of years.

Composition
Prior to the election, the composition of the council was:

Labour Party 28
Conservative Party 26
Liberal Democrat 5
Vacant 1

Following the election, the composition of the council is:

Labour Party 29
Conservative Party 26
Liberal Democrat 5

Election result

Ward results

External links
Results Wolverhampton City Council

2010
2010s in the West Midlands (county)
Wolverhampton City Council election
Wolverhampton City Council election